Walter Kennedy may refer to:
Walter Kennedy (poet) (c. 1455–c. 1508), Scottish poet
Walter Kennedy (pirate) (died 1721), Irish pirate
Walter S. Kennedy (died 1954), All-American football player for the University of Chicago, 1897–1898
J. Walter Kennedy (1912–1977), commissioner of the National Basketball Association
Wally Kennedy (born 1948), radio host
Walter L. Kennedy (1920–1997), politician in the Vermont House of Representatives